In financial mathematics, a conditional risk measure is a random variable of the financial risk (particularly the downside risk) as if measured at some point in the future.  A risk measure can be thought of as a conditional risk measure on the trivial sigma algebra.  

A dynamic risk measure is a risk measure that deals with the question of how evaluations of risk at different times are related.  It can be interpreted as a sequence of conditional risk measures. 

A different approach to dynamic risk measurement has been suggested by Novak.

Conditional risk measure
Consider a portfolio's returns at some terminal time  as a random variable that is uniformly bounded, i.e.,  denotes the payoff of a portfolio.  A mapping  is a conditional risk measure if it has the following properties for random portfolio returns :

 Conditional cash invariance
 

 Monotonicity
 

 Normalization
 

If it is a conditional convex risk measure then it will also have the property:

 Conditional convexity
 

A conditional coherent risk measure is a conditional convex risk measure that additionally satisfies:

 Conditional positive homogeneity

Acceptance set

The acceptance set at time  associated with a conditional risk measure is
 .

If you are given an acceptance set at time  then the corresponding conditional risk measure is
 
where  is the essential infimum.

Regular property
Any normalized conditional convex risk measure is regular.

The financial interpretation of this states that the conditional risk at some future node (i.e. ) only depends on the possible states from that node.  In a binomial model this would be akin to calculating the risk on the subtree branching off from the point in question.

Time consistent property

A dynamic risk measure is time consistent if and only if .

Example: dynamic superhedging price
The dynamic superhedging price involves conditional risk measures of the form 
.  
It is shown that this is a time consistent risk measure.

References

Financial risk modeling